Kolusu Parthasarathy (born 18 April 1965) is an Indian politician. He represents the YSRCP from Penamaluru Assembly Constituency, Krishna District of Andhra Pradesh. He was elected to the Andhra Pradesh Legislative Assembly for three terms, in 2004, 2009 and 2019. Elected first in 2004 from the Vuyyur Constituency, and then in 2009 and 2019 elected from the Penamaluru Constituency. He is the president of the Krishna District YSR Congress Party.

He served as Minister for Animal Husbandry, Dairy Development, Fisheries and Veterinary University in the cabinet of Y.S. Rajasekhar Reddy. Pardha Saradhy was allotted the portfolio of Secondary Education, Govt.Examinations, and Intermediate Education. He was the last Minister for Secondary Education for united Andhra Pradesh.

Early life  
Parthasarathy was born on 18 April 1965 at Karakampadu, Krishna district, Andhra Pradesh in a political family. His father Kolusu Pedareddaiah Yadav is a politician and in 1991 and 1996 was elected as Member of Machilipatnam Lok Sabha Constituency. His mother was a housewife.

Career 
As a member of the Indian National Congress (INC) party, he was elected as an MLA for the first time in 2004 elections from Vuyyur Assembly Constituency. He is the last MLA from Vuyyur Assembly Constituency. He served as Minister for Animal Husbandry, Dairy Development, Fisheries and Veterinary University in the cabinet of Y. S. Rajasekhar Reddy and continued with the same ministry in K. Rosaiah's team. Parthasarathy was elected to Assembly from Penamaluru Constituency for the second term in the 2009 elections, after reorganisation of the constituencies. In the re-formation of the cabinet by N. Kiran Kumar Reddy, Saradhy was allotted the portfolio of Secondary Education, Govt. Examinations, A. P. Residential Educational Institutions Society, Hyderabad Public School and Intermediate Education. He was the last Minister for Secondary Education for united Andhra Pradesh. When INC divided AP into Andhra Pradesh and Telangana he resigned from the INC and played a major role in Samaikyandhra movement in Krishan District leaders.

In 2014 Parthasarathy joined YSR Congress Party. He left Penamaluru and he lost the race for the Machilipatnam Constituency in 2014. He is the working president of YSR Congress Party for Krishna District. Sarathy was fighting for Special Status for A.P. He brought all parties leaders of Krishna District onto one platform on the issue of Special Status. In the 2019 general election he contested as Member of the Andhra Pradesh Legislative Assembly for Penamaluru and he won with majority of 11,317 over the incumbent Bode Prasad.

Achievements 
 He was elected as an MLA for the first time in 2004 elections from Vuyyur Assembly Constituency, he is the last MLA for Vuyyur.
 He served as Minister for Animal Husbandry for the combined state of Andhra Pradesh. 
 He is the last Minister for Secondary Education for the combined state of Andhra Pradesh.
 He won every time when he contested as Member of Legislative Assembly.

References

Living people
Telugu politicians
People from Krishna district
YSR Congress Party
1965 births
Andhra Pradesh MLAs 2019–2024